is a Japanese model and beauty pageant titleholder who won Miss Universe Japan 2012. she represented Japan at Miss Universe 2012 in Las Vegas.

Miss Universe Japan 2012
Ayako Hara was crowned "Miss Universe Japan 2012" at the Osaka International Convention Center on 1 April 2012.

References

External links 
Miss Universe Japan

Japanese female models
Miss Universe 2012 contestants
People from Tokyo
Living people
1988 births
Japanese beauty pageant winners